William Lacy Swing (September 11, 1934 – June 12, 2021) was a diplomat and former United States Ambassador, and United Nations Special Representative of the Secretary-General and Under Secretary General. He was the Director-General of the International Organization for Migration until António Vitorino's appointment in 2018.

Early life and education
Swing was born on September 11, 1934, in Lexington, North Carolina. In 1956 he graduated from Catawba College in North Carolina (Bachelor of Arts). Four years later he received a Master of Divinity from Yale University. He did post-graduate studies at the University of Tübingen in Germany. He was a Fellow at Harvard University from 1976 to 1977.

He held an honorary degree from Geneva School of Diplomacy and International Relations and Hofstra University (Doctor of Humane Letters), and was an Honorary Fellow of Harris Manchester College, Oxford.

He spoke French, German, Afrikaans, and Creole.

Ambassadorial posts

 United States Ambassador to the People's Republic of the Congo (1979–81)
 United States Ambassador to Liberia (1981–85)
 United States Ambassador to South Africa (1989–92)
 United States Ambassador to Nigeria (1992–93)
 United States Ambassador to Haiti (1993–98)
 United States Ambassador to the Democratic Republic of the Congo (1998–2001)

United Nations

Western Sahara
Swing served as UN Special Representative of the Secretary-General to Western Sahara from 2001 to 2003. He was Chief of Mission for the United Nations Mission for the Referendum in Western Sahara (MINURSO).

Democratic Republic of the Congo
Swing then led the MONUSCO (the United Nations Organization Stabilization Mission in the Democratic Republic of the Congo) (May 2003 - January 2008). He was appointed as Special Representative of the Secretary General to the United Nations Mission in the Democratic Republic of Congo (MONUC), with the rank of Under Secretary General. MONUC, now known as MONUSCO, is the UN's largest peace operation. The Mission is engaged in the peace process and providing security support to the country as it seeks to end armed conflict in the war torn eastern part of the Congo.

International Organization for Migration
In June 2008 Swing was elected Director-General of the International Organization for Migration (IOM). In early 2017, UN Secretary-General António Guterres appointed him to the 9-member High-Level Task Force to Improve the United Nations Approach for Preventing and Addressing Sexual Abuse.

Swing's term as Director-General ended in September 2018. He was succeeded by Portuguese politician Antonio Vitorino on October 1.

Awards
He was a member of the American Academy of Diplomacy. In 2012, he received the American Foreign Service Association's Award for Lifetime Contributions to American Diplomacy.

In 2019, he was awarded the Grand Cordon of the Order of the Rising Sun, by the government of Japan.

References

External links

Foreign Service Journal article on his Lifetime Contributions to American Diplomacy Award.

1934 births
2021 deaths
People from Lexington, North Carolina
Catawba College alumni
Yale Divinity School alumni
University of Tübingen alumni
American expatriates in Germany
American expatriates in Western Sahara
Harvard Fellows
Politics of Western Sahara
United Nations peacekeeping
Under-Secretaries-General of the United Nations
American officials of the United Nations
United States Foreign Service personnel
Ambassadors of the United States to Haiti
Ambassadors of the United States to Liberia
Ambassadors of the United States to Nigeria
Ambassadors of the United States to South Africa
Ambassadors of the United States to the Democratic Republic of the Congo
Ambassadors of the United States to the Republic of the Congo
Officers Crosses of the Order of Merit of the Federal Republic of Germany
Grand Cordons of the Order of the Rising Sun
20th-century American politicians
21st-century American politicians
20th-century American diplomats
21st-century American diplomats
20th-century United States government officials
21st-century United States government officials
Special Representatives of the Secretary-General of the United Nations